Øvre Pasvik Landscape Protection Area, is located in Pasvikdalen in the municipality of Sør-Varanger in Finnmark, Norway.

References

Protected areas established in 2003
Sør-Varanger
Protected areas of Troms og Finnmark
Tourist attractions in Troms og Finnmark
Landscape protection areas in Norway
2003 establishments in Norway
Norway–Russia border